Los Roques Airport  – a small domestic airport on the El Gran Roque island in the Los Roques archipelago off the coast of mainland Venezuela, some  north of Caracas.

The runway was repaved in 2007. Air traffic is controlled remotely from Simón Bolívar International Airport.

Airlines and destinations

Accidents

See also
Transport in Venezuela
List of airports in Venezuela

References

External links
OurAirports - Los Roques
SkyVector - Los Roques
 "Aeropuertos - Pistas: Los Roques (Gran Roque) - SVRS" (official info about SVRS from the Venezuelan authorities) 
 "Noticias: Rehabilitación de la pista de Los Roques va por la mitad." VolarEnVenezuela.com, 19 June 2007. Link accessed 2008-1-5. 
 "Accidentes Aéreos: Cae al Mar el YV2081, LET-410 en Los Roques el 4-1-2008", VolarEnVenezuela.com, 4 January 2008. Link accessed 2008-1-5. 
 Aerial picture of the airport and island
 

Airports in Venezuela
Los Roques Archipelago